dittoTV was a video-on-demand platform launched in 2012, from the digital arm of Zee Entertainment Enterprises Limited (ZEE), Zee Digital Convergence Limited. The service was integrated with ZEE5 on 15 February 2018. It was India's most popular over-the-top media services TV distribution platform offering LIVE TV and Catch Up Content to end consumers on their mobile phones, tablets, laptops, desktops, entertainment boxes and connected TVs.

dittoTV was available across the globe in all international markets like the United States (currently unavailable), United Kingdom, United Arab Emirates, New Zealand, Australia and others. dittoTV hosted 100+ Live TV channels.

dittoTV offered features such as an electronic programme guide, a content recommendation engine, & multi currency payment option all of which was integral to enhancing the user experience.

Technology
Over the Top (OTT) – Over-the-top content (OTT) refers to delivery of audio, video, and other media over the internet without a multiple system operator being involved in the control or distribution of the content.

ZEE5 Integration
ZEE5 has subsumed Zee's existing video streaming platforms Ozee (advertising-based) and Ditto TV (subscription-based), comes with 1 lakh hours of content including exclusive originals, Indian and international movies and TV shows, music, live television, health and lifestyle videos in 12 regional languages

See also
 Jio TV
 Subhash Chandra
 Video on demand
 Digital rights management
 Zee Entertainment Enterprises
 Over-the-top (OTT)

References

External links 
 Official Website
 Zee Entertainment

Indian entertainment websites
Defunct video on demand services